Carabus olympiae is a species of beetle in family Carabidae, that can be found in France and Italy. It is considered to be vulnerable on the IUCN scale.

The species is among the largest European species: its length ranges from 3 to 4 cm.

It has a metallic emerald green livery with iridescent and bluish reflections, sometimes with red shades.

This species is not able to fly due to its reduced wing length.

References

olympiae
Beetles of Europe
Beetles described in 1855
Taxonomy articles created by Polbot